Halieutaea is a fish genus in the family Ogcocephalidae.

Species
There are currently nine recognized species in this genus:

References

Ogcocephalidae
Taxa named by Achille Valenciennes
Marine fish genera